The Director General (German: Der Herr Generaldirektor) is a 1925 German silent film directed by Fritz Wendhausen and starring Albert Bassermann, Hanna Ralph and Alexandra Sorina.

The film's sets were designed by the art director Robert Neppach.

Cast
 Albert Bassermann as Generaldirektor Herbert Heidenberg 
 Hanna Ralph as Gerda 
 Alexandra Sorina as Hanna Weyl 
 Alfred Abel as Konstantin Avalescu 
 Hermann Vallentin as Karl Mollheim 
 Kurt Vespermann as Reinhold Gehrke 
 Bruno Ziener
 Wilhelm Diegelmann

References

Bibliography
 Bock, Hans-Michael & Bergfelder, Tim. The Concise CineGraph. Encyclopedia of German Cinema. Berghahn Books, 2009.

External links

1925 films
Films of the Weimar Republic
Films directed by Fritz Wendhausen
German silent feature films
German black-and-white films
UFA GmbH films